Jonathan Leria (born 4 June 1990 in Décines-Charpieu) is a French basketball player who played for the French Pro-A league clubs Pau-Lacq-Orthez and Paris-Levallois during the 2008-2011 seasons.

References

French men's basketball players
1990 births
Living people
People from Décines-Charpieu
Sportspeople from Lyon Metropolis
21st-century French people